The commissioning of the Twelve Apostles is an episode in the ministry of Jesus that appears in all three Synoptic Gospels: Matthew 10:1–4, Mark 3:13–19 and Luke 6:12–16. It relates the initial selection of the Twelve Apostles among the disciples of Jesus.

Biblical accounts
According to Luke:
One of those days Jesus went out to a mountainside to pray, and spent the night praying to God. When morning came, he called his disciples to him and chose twelve of them, whom he also designated apostles: Simon (whom he named Peter), his brother Andrew, James, John, Philip, Bartholomew, Matthew, Thomas, James son of Alphaeus, Simon who was called the Zealot, Judas son of James, and Judas Iscariot, who became a traitor.

According to Matthew:
Jesus called his twelve disciples to him and gave them authority to drive out impure spirits and to heal every disease and sickness.  These are the names of the twelve apostles: first, Simon (who is called Peter) and his brother Andrew; James son of Zebedee, and his brother John; Philip and Bartholomew; Thomas and Matthew the tax collector; James son of Alphaeus, and Thaddaeus; Simon the Zealot and Judas Iscariot, who betrayed him.

According to Mark:
Jesus went up on a mountainside and called to him those he wanted, and they came to him. He appointed twelve that they might be with him and that he might send them out to preach and to have authority to drive out demons.  These are the twelve he appointed: Simon (to whom he gave the name Peter), James son of Zebedee and his brother John (to them he gave the name Boanerges, which means “sons of thunder”), Andrew, Philip, Bartholomew, Matthew, Thomas, James son of Alphaeus, Thaddaeus, Simon the Zealot and Judas Iscariot, who eventually betrayed him.

In the Gospel of Matthew, this episode takes place shortly before the miracle of the man with a withered hand. In the Gospel of Mark and Gospel of Luke it appears shortly after that miracle.

This commissioning of the apostles takes place before the crucifixion of Jesus, while the Great Commission in  takes place after his resurrection.

Commentary
The German theologian Friedrich Justus Knecht (d. 1921) reflects on the question, "why did our Lord Jesus Christ choose for this stupendous office twelve ignorant men, of a low station in life, and of no importance in the eyes of the world?" He answers, "it was to show to the whole world that the maintenance and spread of the Church and her doctrine were not due to human wisdom and learning, but solely to His grace and protection. 'The foolish things of the world hath God chosen that He may confound the wise; and the weak things of the world hath God chosen that He may confound the strong; and the base things of the world, and the things that are contemptible, hath God chosen; and things that are not, that He might bring to nought things that are: that no flesh should glory in His sight' (i Cor. i, 27. 28. 29)."

St. Jerome comments on this passage saying, "A kind and merciful Lord and Master does not envy His servants and disciples a share in His powers. As Himself had cured every sickness and disease, He imparted the same power to His Apostles. But there is a wide difference between having and imparting, between giving and receiving. Whatever He does He does with the power of a master, whatever they do it is with confession of their own weakness, as they speak, In the name of Jesus rise and walk. (Acts 3:6.) A catalogue of the names of the Apostles is given, that all false Apostles might be excluded. The names of the twelve Apostles are these; First, Simon who is called Peter, and Andrew his brother. To arrange them in order according to their merit is His alone who searches the secrets of all hearts. But Simon is placed first, having the surname of Peter given to distinguish him from the other Simon surnamed Chananæus, from the village of Chana in Galilee where the Lord turned the water into wine."

See also
 Calling of Matthew
 Dispersion of the Apostles
 First disciples of Jesus
 Gospel harmony
 The Great Commission
 Life of Jesus in the New Testament
 Matthew 10, Mark 3, Luke 6

Further reading

References 

Gospel episodes
Twelve Apostles